Central Park is an American musical animated sitcom created by Loren Bouchard, Nora Smith and Josh Gad for Apple TV+, using the same art style as Bouchard's previous series Bob's Burgers. Debuting on May 29, 2020, the series revolves around a family living in Central Park in New York City who must save it from a greedy land developer.

In March 2021, the series was given an early third season renewal and the second season premiered on June 25, 2021. The third season premiered on September 9, 2022.

Premise
Told through the eyes of a fourth wall-aware busker narrator, named Birdie, the musical series tells the story of the Tillerman–Hunter family who live in Edendale Castle in Central Park. Patriarch Owen (the dorky manager of the park), his wife Paige (a journalist always stuck with writing fluff pieces who hopes to write a real story), their daughter Molly (loves drawing comics about herself and a boy she has a crush on) and their son Cole (an emotional young boy who loves animals). Their lives change when an elderly heiress and entrepreneur named Bitsy Brandenham and her frequently abused assistant Helen plot to buy up all the land in Central Park and turn it into more condominiums, shopping stores and restaurants as a way of getting back at the world. The Tillermans must also deal with their issues and save the park.

Cast

Main
Kristen Bell (season 1) and Emmy Raver-Lampman (season 2–present) as Molly Tillerman, Owen and Paige's daughter; Cole's sister; she likes drawing her comic books about herself as a hair-powered superhero named Fista-Puffs who fights crime. 
Tituss Burgess as Cole Tillerman, Owen and Paige's son; Molly's brother; an emotional boy who wants Bitsy's dog, Shampagne, as he shows more affection and care for him than his owner does. Burgess also voices Kelleth Vanbeaceler, the author of The Squirrel Quarrels, Cole's favorite fantasy series, in "Squirrel, Interrupted".
Daveed Diggs as Helen, Bitsy's assistant; she is frequently abused by her employer and hopes to inherit the Brandenham fortune for herself one day.
Josh Gad as Birdie, a busker at the park and the show's narrator who gleefully talks about the events while also offering friendly, albeit occasionally annoying, support for Owen. Birdie has trouble staying professional in his work. He believes a narrator's job is to act as a guardian angel to the protagonists in the story they are following.
Kathryn Hahn as Paige Hunter, Molly and Cole's mother; Owen's wife; a reporter for a not very notable New York newspaper who wants to report on real stories and not fluff pieces so that she can prove her worth.
Leslie Odom Jr. as Owen Tillerman, Molly and Cole's father; Paige's husband; the park manager who wishes that the park, which he worships, was treated as carefully as he treats it.
Stanley Tucci as Bitsy Brandenham, a business entrepreneur who wants to replace Central Park with a bunch of condos and retail space for personal reasons. She is the owner of Shampagne, a Shi-Poo that she unknowingly abuses and Cole is unhealthily obsessed with. She is the owner of Brandenham Hotel in Manhattan.
Keala Settle as Young Bitsy.
Kristen Bell as Abby (season 3), Paige's sister who moves to New York to follow her dream of being a successful actress. Following her replacement for the voice of Molly, it was announced that Bell would voice a new character in the third season of the series in a main capacity.

Recurring

H. Jon Benjamin as Whitney Whitebottom, the Mayor of New York City who is in league with Bitsy. He later resigns as mayor after Paige exposed him.
Eugene Cordero as Brendan Brandenham, a boy that Molly secretly has a crush on and often flies his kite in the park. Molly fantasizes about him as her superhero partner Kite-Boy. He is the grand-nephew of Bitsy Brandenham and opposes her plan to buy Central Park upon learning about it. 
Rory O'Malley as Elwood, a park ranger and Owen's partner who always seems in over his head. He has a pet worm named Diane and has a natural rhythm.  
David Herman as Dmitiry (season 1), a Russian oligarch that Bitsy hopes to get in league with.
Brian Huskey as Doug, Paige's co-worker.
Janelle James as Fran, another park ranger.
Phil LaMarr as Randy, another park ranger.
Tony Shalhoub as Marvin, Paige's boss.
Fred Stoller as Leo Shallenhammer (season 1), a member of the City Council.
Ed Asner as Ambrose Brandenham, Bitsy's older brother.
Ester Dean as Hazel, Molly's friend and lab partner. In Molly's comic, her superhero counterpart is named "The Haze".
Kerri Kenney-Silver as:
Lucy (season 2), a former maid whose employer left her everything in his will.
Dory Sterling (season 2), a hotel owner.
An unnamed member of the Park League (season 2).
Marc Evan Jackson as Anton, Ambrose's butler.
Stephanie Beatriz as Enrique, Cole's friend who shares his interest in the fantasy novel series The Squirrel Quarrels.

Amber Ruffin as Shauna, a friend of Hazel's from her basketball team that Molly gets jealous of. In Molly's comic, her superhero/supervillain counterpart is named "Sha-Boom".

Guest

Introduced in season one 
Fred Armisen as
Esposito, a sanitation engineer manager.
Zoom Abromavich, a movie tour guide whose tours often involve obscure films or deleted scenes of films.
Danny Burstein as Dick Flake, a fishing enthusiast.
John Early as Augustus, Shampagne's dog therapist.
Ron Funches as Danny, a boy who challenged Molly to chess.
Christopher Jackson as Glorious Gary, a local skater in Central Park.
Jessica Lowe as Anya, the wife of Zack and daughter of Dmitiry.
Audra McDonald as Ashley, a likability consultant.
Andrew Rannells as Griffin, another busker and the replacement narrator for the episode "Rival Busker" after Birdie previously gave away a spoiler to Paige.
Robin Thede as Anita, an auditor that Bitsy hires to sabotage the park.
Kelvin Yu as Sheng, another park ranger.

Introduced in season two 
Yvette Nicole Brown as Gina Tracker, the main character of the Tillermans' favorite police procedural.
Thomas Lennon as Leslie Portergrave, the owner of a hotel in Brooklyn.
Norm Lewis as Lionel, a bartender at the Brandenham hotel.
Keith David as Ward Wittlinger, Owen's idol.
Patti LuPone as Roberta McCullough, the owner of What's New, New York?, the newspaper where Paige works.
Henry Winkler as Hank Zevansky, an insurance investigator.
Gavin Creel as Young Hank.
Catherine O'Hara as Gwendolyn Swish, the heiress to Swish Tassels who knocked Bitsy off the Annual 50 Women Over 50 Worth Over 50 Million list.
Jenifer Lewis as Celeste, Owen's mother.

Episodes

Series overview

Season 1 (2020)

Season 2 (2021–22)

Season 3 (2022)

Production

Development 

Central Park was developed by 20th Television and was initially eyed for the Fox Broadcasting Company, which had been looking to create more animated series. The Walt Disney Company subsequently announced its intention to acquire 21st Century Fox, the parent of 20th Century Fox Television, excluding the Fox broadcasting network. After the Fox network decided to pass on Central Park, 20th Century Fox Television, which was about to change ownership, began shopping the project, sparking a heated bidding war among Apple, Netflix, and Hulu. On March 12, 2018, Apple announced it had given the production a two-season straight-to-series order consisting of twenty-six episodes in total. The series was created by Loren Bouchard, Nora Smith, and Josh Gad. Executive producers for the series include Bouchard and Gad with Kevin Larsen serving as producer. Production companies involved with the production include Bento Box Entertainment and Brillstein Entertainment Partners, and 20th Century Fox Television distributes and owns the show.

On July 27, 2018, it was announced that Regina Hicks was joining the series as an executive producer and co-showrunner alongside Bouchard and Gad. Still, credits show her only being listed as a consultant. Former King of the Hill writer Sanjay Shah and former The Office writer Halsted Sullivan serve as the series' showrunners. On March 10, 2021, Apple TV+ renewed the series for a third season ahead of the second-season premiere and the second season premiered on June 25, 2021. Loren Bouchard said seasons two and three will consist of 29 episodes and an additional 115 songs. The third season premiered on September 9, 2022, with the first three episodes available immediately and the rest debuting on a weekly basis until the season finale on November 18, 2022.

Casting 
Alongside the initial series announcement, it was reported that Gad, Leslie Odom Jr., Tituss Burgess, Kristen Bell, Stanley Tucci, Daveed Diggs, and Kathryn Hahn had been cast as series regulars. On July 24, 2020, Emmy Raver-Lampman was cast as Molly Tillerman, the mixed-race protagonist originally portrayed by Bell.

Controversy
In June 2020, Bell, who is white, announced that she would no longer provide the voice of Molly, who is biracial, in the second season of Central Park. Molly's role would be recast with a person of color, and Bell would instead voice a new role. Loren Bouchard had defended this casting at a January 2020 TCA panel, stating that Bell "needed to be Molly, she was always going to honor that character. We couldn't make Molly white or Kristen mixed race, so we had to go forward." Bouchard apologized for that statement in June 2020. The following month, Raver-Lampman was recast to voice the role of Molly. Bell returned to the show in season three in the role of Abby, Paige's sister and an aspiring actress newly arrived in New York.

Music
Each episode includes about four original musical numbers sung by the cast. In total, the first season alone includes 46 original songs. Gad joked he had to "beg, plead and barter to get four songs an episode." The songs in the first two episodes were written by several songwriters, including Elyssa Samsel and Kate Anderson (the songwriters for Olaf's Frozen Adventure), Bouchard, Smith, Davis, Sara Bareilles, and Brent Knopf. Samsel also plays the violin for Birdie's solos. Songs in the first season were written by such artists as Fiona Apple, Meghan Trainor, Cyndi Lauper, Alan Menken and Glenn Slater, Darren Criss, Utkarsh Ambudkar and Aimee Mann. The songs from the first two episodes were made available by Hollywood Records on streaming services the day the show premiered. Among songwriters announced for the second season include cast members Diggs and Gad, as well as Rufus Wainwright, They Might Be Giants, Ingrid Michaelson, returning songwriter Rafael Casal, John Cameron Mitchell, Tank and the Bangas, and Don't Stop or We'll Die.

Track listing

Reception

Critical response
Central Park has received acclaim from critics. On Rotten Tomatoes, the first season holds an approval rating of 94% based on 47 reviews, with an average rating of 7.45/10. The website's critical consensus reads, "With warmth, wit, and a pitch perfect ensemble, Central Park is a joyously hilarious musical love letter to the Big Apple." On Metacritic, it has a weighted average score of 81 out of 100 based on 13 reviews, indicating "universal acclaim".

On Rotten Tomatoes, the second season has an approval rating of 100% based on 16 reviews, with an average rating of 7.60/10. The website's critical consensus states, "Featuring more stellar songs and a tenderhearted focus on family, Central Park is even more delightful in this reprise. On Metacritic, the second season has a weighted average score of 82 out of 100 based on 4 reviews, indicating "universal acclaim".

Accolades

Notes

References

External links
 – official site

2020 American television series debuts
2020s American adult animated television series
2020s American animated comedy television series
2020s American black cartoons
2020s American black sitcoms
2020s American musical comedy television series
English-language television shows
American animated sitcoms
American adult animated comedy television series
American adult animated musical television series
Apple TV+ original programming
Television series by 20th Century Fox Television
Television series by Fox Television Animation
Television series created by Loren Bouchard
Television shows set in New York City
Animated television series about children
Animated television series about families
Central Park
Television series created by Josh Gad